The Galle Gladiators (abbreviated as GG) is a franchise cricket team which played in  the inaugural season of the Lanka Premier League. The team is based in Galle, Southern Province, Sri Lanka. The team remained under the captaincy of Pakistani cricketer, Shahid Afridi, for the first three matches. However, due to an emergency, the captain left the league for the remaining matches of the tournament, and Bhanuka Rajapaksa assumed the captaincy. The team was coached by Pakistani cricket coach Moin Khan. The team is owned by Pakistani organizer Nadeem Omar, who also owns the Pakistan Super League's Quetta Gladiators.

The team qualified for the semi-finals in the 2020 season after winning only two out of eight matches, due to having a higher run rate than its competitor, Kandy Tuskers. The team qualified for the final after trouncing Colombo Kings in the semi-finals. However, they lost in the final to the Jaffna Stallions.

Season summary
In the Galle Gladiators' first-ever LPL match, they played against the Jaffna Stallions. They won the toss and elected to bat first. However, they did not accomplish much besides 58 runs off 23 balls from their captain Shahid Afridi. Stallions won by 8 wickets. Rain affected the second game against the Colombo Kings, with the match being reduced to 5 overs per side. At the end, the Kings batted as Andre Russell hit an unbeaten 65 runs to help the Kings win by 34 runs over the Gladiators.

In the third game of their campaign, the Gladiators came up against the Kandy Tuskers. They conceded 196/5 to the Tuskers batsman, but apart from 82 runs off 53 balls from Danushka Gunathilaka, the Gladiators lost this match. In their fourth game, against the Stallions, the Gladiators' batting once again collapsed, aside from another 50 runs by Gunathilaka. The Gladiators' bowling did not fare much better, as they allowed the Stallions to chase the target.

Their fifth game, against the Dambulla Viiking, was a much closer affair. Gunathilaka hit his third fifty in a row and he was well-supported by wicket-keeper batsman Azam Khan, who also hit a fifty. However, the Gladiators lost the game by nine runs. In their sixth game, the Gladiators fared much better, bowling the Colombo Kings out for 170 runs. This was largely due to Pakistani pacer Mohammad Amir, who took five wickets conceding 26 runs, taking the LPL's first-ever 5 wickets in the process. The Gladiators chased this total down to give them their first win of the season.

The Gladiators came into the seventh game facing the Dambulla Viiking. Samiullah Shinwari's 46 runs off 20 balls helped the Viikings chase down the target of 168 runs. The Gladiator's eighth match, against the Kandy Tuskers, was a virtual quarter-final, with the winner going into the semi-final and the loser going out. Gunathilaka once again was the man with the bat for Galle, as he hit an unbeaten 94 runs to help the Gladiators chase down the target of 126 runs and qualify for the semi-final. This meant the Gladiators finished in fourth place on the table.

The Gladiators opposed Colombo Kings in the semi-final. They were impeccable with the bowling: the pace trio of Mohammad Amir, Nuwan Thushara, and Dhananjaya Lakshan gave away just 80 runs, in 12 overs, picking up 4 wickets. However, with the batting, the Gladiators had enough opportunity to steal the win from Kings. When the game reached its final over, the Gladiators needed 15 off 6 balls. Lakshan struck two sixes, and later Lakshan Sandakan concluded the game by striking a four, giving the Gladiators the win, and they advanced to the final.

The team opposed Jaffna Stallions in the 2020 LPL Final. Pakistani cricketer Shoaib Malik thumped 46 runs off 35 balls and the Stallions set the target of 189 runs. The Gladiators' performance deteriorated, however, as skipper Lakshan hammered 40 off 17 balls, and Pakistani cricketer Azam Khan scored 36 runs off 17 balls. The tournament ended with the Stallions winning the inaugural Lanka Premier League trophy after recording a comprehensive 53-run win over the Gladiators.

Squad

Administration and support staff
Galle Gladiators is owned by Pakistani organizer Nadeem Omar, who also owns the Pakistan Super League's team Quetta Gladiators. Former Pakistani cricketer Zaheer Abbas was appointed as the team's chairman for the season. The team was coached by Pakistani cricketer Moin Khan, and Upul Chandana was assistant coach. Pakistani cricketers Wasim Akram and Azam Khan were the team mentor and manager, respectively.

Season standings

League table

Matches

Statistics

Most runs
The top scorer of Galle Gladiators was Danushka Gunathilaka, who also scored the most runs in 2020 season of LPL than any other team batsman, though the team won only 3 matches. Azam Khan was the second top scorer who made 215 runs. The third and fourth positions were taken by Bhanuka Rajapaksa and Shehan Jayasuriya, respectively. Like the second position, the fifth position was taken by Pakistani cricketer Ahsan Ali, who scored 117 matches in 7 matches.

Most wickets
Dhananjaya Lakshan took 13 wickets in 8 matches, placing second in the season's for most wickets. Lakshan Sandakan took 12 wickets. The only fifer of the season was taken by Mohammad Amir, a Pakistani bowler.

Awards and achievements 
Galle Gladiators won only three matches in the season, therefore three man of the match awards were given to the team players. The first award was given to Mohammad Amir for taking the only fifer in 2020 LPL against Colombo Kings. Danushka Gunathilaka also got an award for making 94 runs in a single inning. The third award was given to Dhananjaya Lakshan.

References

2020 Lanka Premier League
Galle Gladiators